The following lists events that happened during 1959 in Cuba.

Incumbents
President:
 until January 1: Fulgencio Batista
 January 1-January 2: Anselmo Alliegro y Milá
 January 2-January 3: Carlos Manuel Piedra
 January 3-July 18: Manuel Urrutia Lleó
 starting July 18: Osvaldo Dorticós Torrado
Prime Minister:
 until January 1: Gonzalo Güell
 January 1-February 13: José Miró Cardona
 February 13-February 16: vacant
 starting February 16: Fidel Castro

Events

January
 January 1 - President Fulgencio Batista fled to the Dominican Republic as the forces of Fidel Castro closed in. Before leaving, Batista named Judge Carlos Manuel Piedra as provisional president. Piedra ordered a cease-fire moments after taking office.  At , the ships F.M. Robinson, Jack W. Wilke and the Peterson were directed to sail to Cuba to evacuate Americans if necessary.
 January 2 - As Castro's rebel forces rolled into Havana, the 32-year-old leader named Dr. Manuel Urrutia Lleo as President of Cuba.
 January 7 - Cuba's new government announced the first executions of former officials of Fulgencio Batista. Ten officers were executed at Santiago including Col. Arcadio Casillas, who oversaw Santiago. The same day, the United States recognized the new Cuban government of Fidel Castro.
 January 8 - Fidel Castro was greeted by cheering crowds as he made a triumphant entry into Havana.
 January 12 - In the largest mass execution of former officials since Castro's victory, Cuban communists shot 71 supporters of Fulgencio Batista over a seven-hour period, then buried them in a mass grave.

References

 
1950s in Cuba
Years of the 20th century in Cuba
Cuba
Cuba